The All India Mahila Empowerment Party (AIMEP), is an Indian regional political party. It was the founded on 12 November 2017 by Nowhera Shaik.

History 
The All India Mahila Empowerment Party was launched at The Lalit in New Delhi on 12 November 2017 in the presence of important personalities from different fields, including cricketer Mohammed Azharuddin, tennis player Sania Mirza, actors Sunil Shetty, Bobby Deol, Aftab Shivdasani, Zeenat Aman, and Poonam Dhillon, choreographer Farah Khan, and poetess Lata Haya. The prime agenda of the party, as stated, is empowering women, irrespective of caste, creed and region. In its launching ceremony itself, the party has taken up the issue of women's representation in the Parliament of India, demanding the implementation of the Women's Reservation Bill.

Elections 
The Election Commission of India has recognized AIMEP as a national political party, allotting “Diamond” as its election symbol. AIMEP contest all 224 seats in the Karnataka Legislative Assembly elections in April 2018. Despite her party's disastrous performance in the Karnataka elections, she recently announced to contest in the upcoming Telangana elections.  The party currently intends to contest in the parliamentary elections across the country in the year 2019.

Leadership 
 President: Nowhera Shaik
 Mumbai Districts President: Nilesh Bhupendra Patil
 Delhi State President: Mohammed Aqil

Controversy 
Party President Nowhera Shaik was arrested by Mumbai Police's economic offences wing on October 25, 2018. She got a reprieve on 19 January 2021 when the Supreme Court granted an interim bail to her. Giving her six weeks’ time, the court ordered her to clear the liabilities of all the complainants (as on date) in cases where chargesheets have either been filed or complaints have been made.

References

2017 establishments in India
Political parties established in 2017
Political parties in India